Jy Farrar is an Australian rules footballer playing for the Gold Coast Suns in the Australian Football League. The Gold Coast Suns selected Farrar with pick 60 in the 2019 NAB AFL draft. Farrar is the cousin of AFLW player Kitara Whap-Farrar, as well as the cousin of  player Shane McAdam.

Early life
Farrar was born in Halls Creek, Western Australia into a family of Indigenous Australian descent (Bunuba, Jaru and Kija).. He moved to Perth at the age of 14, where he attended boarding school. After spending 5 years in Western Australia, Farrar moved to Wangaratta in regional Victoria, where he played for North Wangaratta Football Club, winning the best and fairest. Not long after, he moved to Adelaide, in order to play for the Scotch Old Collegians Football Club. From there, Farrar played 2 games for 's SANFL side, where he kicked 2 goals.

AFL career
On debut, Farrar kicked 1 goal, collected 6 disposals, and took 2 marks.

Statistics
 'Statistics are correct to the end of round 3, 2022

|- style="background-color: #EAEAEA"
! scope="row" style="text-align:center" | 2020
|
| 50 || 1 || 1 || 0 || 3 || 3 || 6 || 2 || 1 || 1.0 || 0.0 || 3.0 || 3.0 || 6.0 || 2.0 || 1.0
|-
! scope="row" style="text-align:center" | 2021
|
| 50 || 10 || 0 || 0 || 90 || 55 || 145 || 56 || 14 || 0.0 || 0.0 || 9.0 || 5.5 || 14.5 || 5.6 || 1.4
|- style="background-color: #EAEAEA"
! scope="row" style="text-align:center" | 2022
|
| 50 || 0 || – || – || – || – || – || – || – || – || – || – || – || – || – || –
|- class="sortbottom"
! colspan=3| Career
! 11
! 1
! 0
! 93
! 58
! 151
! 58
! 15
! 0.1
! 0.0
! 8.5
! 5.3
! 13.7
! 5.3
! 1.4
|}

References

External links

1996 births
Living people
Australian rules footballers from Western Australia
Gold Coast Football Club players
People educated at Hale School